George Ramm (born 1 August 1996) is an English international freestyle wrestler. He has represented England at three Commonwealth Games and won a bronze medal in 2022.

Biography
Ramm competed in the 2014 and 2018 Commonwealth Games, finishing fourth on the Gold Coast in 2018.

In 2022, he was selected for the 2022 Commonwealth Games in Birmingham where he competed in the men's 65 kg category, winning the bronze medal.

References

1996 births
Living people
English male wrestlers
British male wrestlers
Wrestlers at the 2014 Commonwealth Games
Wrestlers at the 2018 Commonwealth Games
Wrestlers at the 2022 Commonwealth Games
Commonwealth Games competitors for England
Commonwealth Games bronze medallists for England
Commonwealth Games medallists in wrestling
20th-century English people
21st-century English people
Medallists at the 2022 Commonwealth Games